The Fresh Prince of Bel-Air is an American television sitcom that aired on NBC from September 10, 1990, to May 20, 1996. The series stars Will Smith as a fictionalized version of himself, a street-smart teenager born and raised in West Philadelphia who is sent to move in with his wealthy uncle and aunt in their Bel-Air mansion after getting into a fight in the local playground in his neighborhood. 148 episodes were produced over six seasons.

Series overview

Episodes

Season 1 (1990–91)

Season 2 (1991–92)

Season 3 (1992–93)

Season 4 (1993–94)

Season 5 (1994–95)

Season 6 (1995–96)

Notes

References

External links 
 
 

Fresh Prince of Bel-Air, The
Episodes